Amie "Breeze" Harper is an American critical race feminist, diversity strategist, and author of books and studies on veganism and racism. Her Sistah Vegan anthology features a collection of writings by black female vegans.

Life and career
Harper attributes her initial interest in practicing veganism to the influence of the work of Dick Gregory in connecting diet to the liberation struggle of marginalized groups, and to Afrocentric, raw foodist Queen Afua.

In 2015, Harper organized a conference, The Vegan Praxis of Black Lives Matters, to discuss intersectional issues concerning veganism and the Black Lives Matter movement. In the same year, Harper joined the advisory board for Black Vegans Rock.

Harper was the Humane Party's vice-presidential nominee for the 2016 U.S. presidential election.

Publications 

 "Chapter 12: Veganporn.com & 'Sistah': Explorations of Whiteness through Textual Linguistic Cyberminstrelsy on the Internet"
 Chapter 10: "Vegans of color, racialized embodiment, and problematics of the 'exotic'"
 Chapter 12: "Going Beyond the Normative White 'Post-Racial' Vegan Epistemology"

See also 

Critical race theory

References

External links 

The Sistah Vegan Project
Black Vegans Rock

Living people
21st-century American writers
21st-century American women writers
African-American women writers
African-American writers
African-American feminists
African-American candidates for Vice President of the United States
American feminists
American anti-racism activists
American veganism activists
Critical race theory
Female candidates for Vice President of the United States
Harvard Extension School alumni
LGBT African Americans
LGBT women
University of California, Davis alumni
2016 United States vice-presidential candidates
Year of birth missing (living people)
21st-century American women politicians
21st-century American politicians
Dartmouth College alumni
Women anthologists